The 1968 NAIA men's basketball tournament was held in March at Municipal Auditorium in Kansas City, Missouri. The 31st annual NAIA basketball tournament featured 32 teams playing in a single-elimination format.

Awards and honors
 Leading scorer: Ron Hayek, Wisconsin-Oshkosh; 5 games, 47 field goals, 22 free throws, 116 total points (23.2 average points per game)
 Leading rebounder: Wayne Denham, Fairmont State (W.Va.); 5 games, 68 total rebounds (13.6 average rebounds per game)
 Player of the Year: est. 1994

1968 NAIA bracket

Third-place game
The third-place game featured the losing teams from the national semifinalist to determine 3rd and 4th places in the tournament. This game was played until 1988.

See also
 1968 NCAA University Division basketball tournament
 1968 NCAA College Division basketball tournament

References

NAIA Men's Basketball Championship
Tournament
NAIA men's basketball tournament
NAIA men's basketball tournament
College basketball tournaments in Missouri
Basketball competitions in Kansas City, Missouri